Jorge Luis Márquez Pérez (born April 13, 1960) is a Puerto Rican politician and the current mayor of Maunabo. Márquez is affiliated with the Popular Democratic Party (PPD) and has served as mayor since 2001.
Has bachelor's degree in chemistry from the University of Puerto Rico at Humacao.

References

Living people
Mayors of places in Puerto Rico
Popular Democratic Party (Puerto Rico) politicians
People from Maunabo, Puerto Rico
1960 births